Parasyrphus vittiger is a species of hoverfly, from the family Syrphidae, in the order Diptera.

Description
External images
For terms see Morphology of Diptera Wing length 6·25- 8·75 mm. Hind tibia yellow at base and apex. Pterostigma grey. Fore tarsus with segments 4 and 5 darkened (other segments yellow).
The male terminalia are figured by Hippa (1968). Larva described and figured by Rotheray (1994). See references for determination.

Distribution
Palearctic Fennoscandia South to the Pyrenees and central Spain. Ireland East through Europe and European Russia. Caucasus and from the Urals to central Siberia (Cis-Baikal, Yakutia).

Biology
Habitat: Abies, Picea, Pinus forest and Fagus woodland. Flowers
visited include Alchemilla, Galium, Potentilla erecta, Ranunculus, Salix,, Taraxacum see list in Speight (refs) for more. Flies April to September. The larva is predatory on aphids.

References

Diptera of Europe
Syrphinae
Insects described in 1843
Taxa named by Johan Wilhelm Zetterstedt